Treat Conrad Huey and Harsh Mankad were the defending champions, but they didn't compete this year.Robert Kendrick and Travis Rettenmaier won the final against Ryler DeHeart and Pierre-Ludovic Duclos 6–1, 6–4.

Seeds

  Carsten Ball /  Chris Guccione (quarterfinals, withdrew)
  Rik de Voest /  Izak van der Merwe (first round)
  Ryler DeHeart /  Pierre-Ludovic Duclos (final)
  Robert Kendrick /  Travis Rettenmaier (champions)

Draw

Draw

External links
 Main Draw
 Qualifying Doubles Draw

Royal Bank of Scotland Challenger - Doubles
2010 Doubles